Ayşe Oktay Sözeri  (born 27 January 1974) is a Turkish windsurfer. She competed in the women's mistral one design event at the 1996 Summer Olympics.

References

External links
 
 
 

1974 births
Living people
Turkish windsurfers
Female windsurfers
Turkish female sailors (sport)
Olympic sailors of Turkey
Sailors at the 1996 Summer Olympics – Mistral One Design
People from Kayseri